Aristida capillacea is a species of plants in the grass family (Poaceae). It is found in South America.

Note:  Aristida capillacea Cav. is a synonyms for Aristida cumingiana Trin. & Rupr.

References

External links
 Aristida capillacea at The Plant List
 Aristida capillacea at Tropicos

capillacea
Plants described in 1791
Grasses of South America